Ricardo Emelindo Joseph Harrigan (August 24, 1939 – September 8, 1979) was a Dominican professional baseball corner infielder, who played in Major League Baseball (MLB) for the Kansas City Athletics and the Philadelphia Phillies in all or parts of five seasons (–).

He batted and threw right-handed.

Baseball career
Originally signed by the San Francisco Giants, Joseph played in their minor league system from 1959 to 1963, batting .320, .319, and .326, respectively, in his first three seasons. On December 2, 1963, he was drafted by the Kansas City Athletics in the 1963 minor league draft.

Joseph made his big league debut with the Athletics on June 18, 1964. On November 29, 1966, he was drafted by the Philadelphia Phillies in the 1966 minor league draft. The Phillies sent him to their San Diego Padres farm team. There, in 1967, Joseph received the Most Valuable Player Award of the Triple-A Pacific Coast League (PCL), after batting .300 with 24 home runs for the league champion Padres. The performance earned him an August 31 call-up to the Phillies.

On September 16, 1967, against the Los Angeles Dodgers, he hit his first MLB home run, a pinch-hit, walk-off grand slam off Ron Perranoski to give the Phillies an 8-4 win. Through 2019, Joseph is the last MLB player to hit a walk-off grand slam for his first career home run.

After playing the next three seasons with Philadelphia as a utility player, Joseph  became expendable when emerging young players such as Don Money and Greg Luzinski, as well as veteran Deron Johnson began to signal a changing of the guard. As such, on January 12, 1971, he was traded by the Philadelphia Phillies to the Chicago White Sox for pitcher Bucky Brandon. Joseph would play the next three years for several minor league and Mexican League teams, never again playing in the major leagues.

Joseph died in 1979 of complications from diabetes, at the age of 40.

References

External links

Rick Joseph at Pura Pelota (Venezuelan Professional Baseball League)

1939 births
1979 deaths
Cardenales de Lara players
Charleston Charlies players
Dallas Rangers players
Deaths from diabetes
Diablos Rojos del México players
Dominican Republic expatriate baseball players in Canada
Dominican Republic expatriate baseball players in Mexico
Dominican Republic expatriate baseball players in the United States
Fresno Giants players
Hawaii Islanders players
Kansas City Athletics players

Leones de Yucatán players
Major League Baseball infielders
Major League Baseball players from the Dominican Republic
Mexican League baseball players
Michigan City White Caps players
Pacific Coast League MVP award winners
Philadelphia Phillies players
Richmond Braves players
San Diego Padres (minor league) players
Springfield Giants players
Syracuse Chiefs players
Tacoma Giants players
Vancouver Mounties players
Dominican Republic expatriate baseball players in Venezuela